Pettitt v Pettitt [1970] AC 777 is a leading English trusts law case, concerning the presumption of advancement and a spouse's equitable interest in the matrimonial home.

Facts
In Pettitt, the wife had used her own money to buy a house during the
marriage, meaning the title to the house had been in the wife's name, and both she and her husband resided therein until the wife left the husband. The
husband claimed that he had carried out a considerable number of improvements
to the house and garden. These improvements consisted of internal
decoration work, building a wardrobe, laying a lawn and constructing an
ornamental wall and a side wall in the garden. By virtue of these efforts the
husband sought a beneficial interest in the proceeds of sale of the property.

Judgment

In the course of his judgment, Lord Diplock said,

"It would, in my view, be an abuse of the legal technique for ascertaining or imputing intention to apply to transactions between the post-war generation of married couples "presumptions which are based upon inferences of fact which an earlier generation of judges drew as to the most likely intentions of earlier generations of spouses belonging to the propertied classes of a different social era."

References

See also
English trusts law

English trusts case law
House of Lords cases
1969 in British law
1969 in case law
English property case law